Devadas Kanakala (30 July 1945 – 2 August 2019) was an Indian actor from Andhra Pradesh who predominantly appeared in Telugu language films and TV shows. Rajnikanth,  Chiranjeevi and Rajendra Prasad trained under him.
He was a  very good trainer for acting skills

Family 
He is the father of actors Rajeev Kanakala and Sri Laxmi, and the father-in-law of TV anchor Suma Kanakala. He founded an acting school in Hyderabad, India.  His wife, Lakshmi Kanakala, served as the school's principal until her death in 2018.

Filmography

As actor

O Seeta Katha (1974)
Mangalyanaki Maromudi (1976)
Siri Siri Muvva (1978)
Gorintaku (1979)
Manchupallaki (1982)
Bhale Ammayilu (1982)
Bhale Dampathlu (1989)
Chettu Kinda Pleader (1989)
Gang Leader (1991)
Ammo! Okato Tareekhu (2000)
Mee Aayana Jagratha (2000)
Manasantha Nuvve (2001)
Okato Number Kurradu (2002)
Sreeram (2002)
Sambhu (2003)
 Amrutham serial as Amrutham's Father-in-law, Sanju's father (2003)
Anaganaga O Kurradu (2003)
Pedababu (2004)
Dhana 51 (2005)
Malliswari (2004) as Lawyer
Asadhyudu (2006)
Okka Magaadu (2008)
King (2008)
Josh (2009)
Subapradam (2010)
Nee Sneham
Enthiran (2010; Tamil)
Bharat Ane Nenu (2018)

As director
Chali Cheemalu (1978)
Nijam
Nagamalli
O Intti Bagotham
PunyaBhoomi Kallu Terichinddi

References

External links 

Male actors from Andhra Pradesh
Indian male film actors
20th-century Indian male actors
1945 births
2019 deaths
Andhra University alumni